Cimburk Castle is a castle located in the Czech Republic. It was built between 1320 and the 1330's. Štěpán of Vartnov repaired the castles damage in 1468. Josef Schwoy described the castle in 1793. Conservation work began in the early 1900's.

References

Castles in the Czech Republic